A volute is a spiral, scroll-like ornament that forms the basis of the Ionic order, found in the capital of the Ionic column. It was later incorporated into Corinthian order and Composite column capitals. Four are normally to be found on an Ionic capital, eight on Composite capitals and smaller versions (sometimes called helix) on the Corinthian capital.

The word derives from the Latin voluta ("scroll"). It has been suggested that the ornament was inspired by the curve of a ram's horns, or perhaps was derived from the natural spiral found in the ovule of a common species of clover native to Greece. Alternatively, it may simply be of geometrical origin.

The ornament can be seen in Renaissance and Baroque architecture and is a common decoration in furniture design, silverware and ceramics.  A method of drawing the complex geometry was devised by the ancient Roman architect Vitruvius through the study of classical buildings and structures.

See also
Scrollwork
Ionic order
Spiral

References

External links
 

Columns and entablature
Ornaments (architecture)
Ancient Roman architectural elements